Henri Smets (Wezembeek-Oppem, 23 December 1896 - Brussel, 11 March 1950) was a Belgian cross country athlete. He was a participant of the 1920 Olympic Games in Antwerp.

Performances

Olympic

Participant of the de VII° 1920 Summer Olympics  Antwerp
Results
Men 5000 m: 8th in heat 4
Men individual crosscountry : 33d
Men team crosscountry: 6th
Men team 3000 m: 4th in semi-final

Belgian Championships
1919
Fourth place in Belgian Championship 1500 m

1920
Fourth in Belgian Championship 5000 m

1921
Third place in Belgian Championship 800 m

1922
Fourth place in Belgian Championship 1500 m

References

External links

1896 births
1950 deaths
Belgian male middle-distance runners
Belgian male long-distance runners
Olympic athletes of Belgium
Athletes (track and field) at the 1920 Summer Olympics
People from Wezembeek-Oppem
Olympic cross country runners
Sportspeople from Flemish Brabant